"Songbird" is the title track and first single released from Barbra Streisand's 1978 album Songbird. It was written by Dave Wolfert and Steve Nelson and produced by Gary Klein.

On the Billboard Hot 100 chart, the song peaked at number 25. It spent two weeks atop the Billboard easy listening chart in July and August 1978, her fifth song to accomplish this feat.

One theory as to why "Songbird" was less successful on the U.S. pop chart is that Streisand recorded the theme to the 1978 film Eyes of Laura Mars, which was released as a single a few weeks after "Songbird" came out. "Prisoner (Love Theme from Eyes of Laura Mars)" reached number 21 on the Billboard Hot 100 and may have created competition with herself for pop radio airplay and single sales.

Charts

See also
List of number-one adult contemporary singles of 1978 (U.S.)

References

1978 singles
Barbra Streisand songs
1978 songs
Song recordings produced by Gary Klein (producer)
Columbia Records singles
Pop ballads